Yard House is an American sports bar chain, with 80+ locations across the United States. Founded in 1996 in Long Beach, California by Steele Platt, Tom Yelenick, William Wollrab and Steve Reynolds, it now operates out of Orlando, Florida. Yard House was purchased by Darden Restaurants in 2012 for $585 million.

The Yard House began its East Coast expansion in 2010, with a restaurant in the Legacy Place lifestyle center in the Boston suburb of Dedham.

In mainland China, Yard House USA, Inc. and Darden do not own the Yard House brand; unaffiliated restaurants are operated by a domestic restaurant group.

The restaurant offers a variety of food and focuses on fusion dishes. It also has a major focus on craft beer. Locations have over 100 beers on tap and offer tasting platters of different types of beers.

References

External links

Companies based in Irvine, California
Restaurants established in 1996
Darden Restaurants brands
Restaurant chains in the United States
1996 establishments in California
American companies established in 1996
2012 mergers and acquisitions